Atrina zelandica, one of several species known as the horse mussel, is a large species of saltwater clam in the family Pinnidae, the pen shells. This species is found around New Zealand.

References

Pinnidae
Bivalves described in 1835